Events from the year 1656 in art.

Events
March–December – Naples Plague kills many artists there.
Rembrandt, facing bankruptcy, is forced to arrange sale of most of his paintings and collection of antiquities.

Works

Bernardino Mei – The Charlatan
 Rembrandt – Jacob Blessing the Sons of Joseph
 Diego Velázquez –  Las Meninas (Museo del Prado, Madrid)
 Jan Vermeer – The Procuress (approximate date; Gemäldegalerie, Dresden)

Births
April 9 – Francesco Trevisani, Italian painter of frescoes (died 1746)
April 25 – Giovanni Antonio Burrini, Bolognese painter in late-Baroque or Rococo style (died 1727)
July 15 – Massimiliano Soldani Benzi, Italian sculptor and medallist (died 1740)
August 18 – Ferdinando Galli Bibiena, Italian architect, designer, painter and author (died 1743)
October 10 – Nicolas de Largillière, French painter (died 1746)
November – Jacob de Heusch, Dutch painter (died 1701)
December 11 – Johann Michael Rottmayr, Austrian painter (died 1730)
date unknown
Pierre Aveline, French engraver, print-publisher and print-seller (died 1722)
François Barois, French sculptor (died 1726)
Simone Brentana, Italian painter of the Baroque period, active in Verona (died 1742)
Heinrich Charasky, Hungarian sculptor (died 1710)
José de Cieza, Spanish painter (died 1692)
Louis de Deyster, Flemish painter of churches and maker of musical instruments (died 1711)
Sebastiano Galeotti, peripatetic Italian painter of the late-Baroque period (died 1746)
Maria Oriana Galli-Bibiena, Italian painter (died 1749)
Willem Wissing, Dutch portrait artist (died 1687)

Deaths
April 27
Gerard van Honthorst, Dutch painter of Utrecht (born 1592)
Jan van Goyen, Dutch landscape painter (born 1596)
May 17 - Dirck Hals, Dutch painter of festivals and ballroom scenes (born 1591)
July 12 - Giovanni Giacomo Barbelli, Italian painter, active in Brescia (born 1604)
August - Salomon Koninck, Dutch painter of genre scenes, portraits and an engraver (born 1609)
November 12 - Hendrick van Anthonissen, Dutch marine painter (born 1605)
December 20 - David Beck, Dutch portrait painter (born 1621)
December 28 - Laurent de La Hyre, French painter (born 1606)
date unknown
Guido Ubaldo Abbatini, Italian painter (born 1600)
Jacopo Barbello, Italian painter (born 1590)
Didier Barra, French Renaissance painter (born 1590)
Gregorio Bausá, Spanish painter (born 1590)
Remigio Cantagallina, Italian etcher (born 1582)
Francisco Collantes, Spanish painter (born 1599)
Maria de Abarca, Spanish painter of large and miniature portraits (born unknown)
Francesco Francanzano, Italian painter (born 1612; executed for inciting rebellion)
Francisco Herrera the Elder, Spanish painter and founder of the Seville school for the arts (born 1576)
Jean Monier, French painter (born 1600)
victims of Naples Plague
Bernardo Cavallino, Italian painter working in Naples (born 1616)
Massimo Stanzione, Italian Caravaggisti painter of frescoes (born 1586)
probable
Luigi Miradori, Italian painter, active mainly in Cremona (born 1600/1610)
Harmen Steenwijck, Dutch painter of still lifes, notably of fruit (born 1612)
possible - Artemisia Gentileschi, Italian painter (born 1593)

References

 
Years of the 17th century in art
1650s in art